The execution of Louis XVI, a major event of the French Revolution, took place publicly on 21 January 1793 at the Place de la Révolution ("Revolution Square", formerly Place Louis XV, and renamed Place de la Concorde in 1795) in Paris. At a trial on 17 January 1793, the National Convention had convicted the king of high treason in a near-unanimous vote; while no one voted "not guilty", several deputies abstained. Ultimately, they condemned him to death by a simple majority. The execution by guillotine was performed four days later by Charles-Henri Sanson, then High Executioner of the French First Republic and previously royal executioner under Louis.

Often viewed as a turning point in both French and European history, this regicide inspired various reactions around the world. To some, his death at the hands of his former subjects symbolised the long-awaited end of an unbroken thousand-year period of absolute monarchy in France and the true beginning of democracy within the nation, although Louis would not be the last king of France. Others (even some who had supported major political reform) condemned the execution as an act of senseless bloodshed and saw it as a sign that France had devolved into a state of violent, amoral chaos (the Reign of Terror).  

Louis' death emboldened revolutionaries throughout the country, who continued to alter French political and social structure radically over the next several years. Nine months after Louis' death, his wife Marie Antoinette, formerly queen of France, met her own death at the guillotine at the same location in Paris.

Journey to the Place de la Révolution 

Louis XVI awoke early in the morning. After dressing with the aid of his valet Jean-Baptiste Cléry, he went to meet with the non-juring Irish  priest Henry Essex Edgeworth to make his confession. He heard his last Mass, served by Cléry, and received Communion. The Mass requisites were provided by special direction of the authorities. On Edgeworth's advice, Louis avoided a last farewell scene with his family. At 7 o'clock he confided his last wishes to the priest. His royal seal was to go to the Dauphin and his wedding ring to the Queen. After receiving the priest's blessing, he went to meet Antoine Joseph Santerre, Commander of the Guard. A green carriage waited in the second court. He seated himself in it with the priest, with two militiamen sitting opposite them. The carriage left the Temple at approximately 9 o'clock. For more than an hour the carriage, preceded by drummers playing to drown out any support for the King and escorted by a cavalry troop with drawn sabres, made its way through Paris along a route lined with 80,000 men-at-arms (soldiers of the National Guard and sans-culottes).

In the neighbourhood of the present-day rue de Cléry, the Baron de Batz, a supporter of the Royal family who had financed the flight to Varennes, had summoned 300 Royalists to enable the King's escape. Louis was to be hidden in a house in the rue de Cléry belonging to the Count of Marsan. The Baron leaped forward calling "Follow me, my friends, let us save the King!", but his associates had been denounced and only a few had been able to turn up. Three of them were killed, but de Batz managed to escape.

At 10 o'clock, the carriage arrived at Place de la Révolution and proceeded to an area where a scaffold had been erected, in a space surrounded by guns and drums, and by a crowd carrying pikes and bayonets.

Execution
After initially refusing to permit Sanson and his assistants to bind his hands together, Louis XVI relented when Sanson proposed to use his handkerchief instead of rope. The executioner's men cut the king's hair, removed his shirt's collar, and followed him up the scaffold. Upon the platform, Louis proclaimed his innocence to the crowd and expressed his concern for the future of France. He tried to give an extensive speech, but a drum roll was ordered by Antoine Joseph Santerre and the resulting noise made his final words difficult to understand.

The executioners fastened him to the guillotine's bench (bascule), positioning his neck beneath the device's yoke (lunette) to hold it in place, and the blade swiftly decapitated him. Sanson grabbed his severed head out of the receptacle into which it fell and exhibited it to the cheering crowd. According to one witness report, the blade did not sever his neck but instead cut through the back of his skull and into his jaw. Some accounts state that members of the crowd rushed towards the scaffold with handkerchiefs to dip them in his blood and keep as souvenirs.

Witness quotes

Henry Essex Edgeworth

Edgeworth, Louis' Irish confessor, wrote in his memoirs:

Press of the day 
The 13 February issue of the Thermomètre du jour ('Daily Thermometer'), a moderate Republican newspaper, described the King as shouting "I am lost!", citing as its source the executioner, Charles-Henri Sanson.

Charles-Henri Sanson 
The executioner Charles-Henri Sanson responded to the story by offering his own version of events in a letter dated 20 February 1793. The account of Sanson states:

In his letter, published along with its French mistakes in the Thermomètre of Thursday, 21 February 1793, Sanson emphasises that the King "bore all this with a composure and a firmness which has surprised us all. I remained strongly convinced that he derived this firmness from the principles of the religion by which he seemed penetrated and persuaded as no other man."

Henri Sanson 

In his Causeries, Alexandre Dumas refers to a meeting circa 1830 with Henri Sanson, eldest son of Charles-Henri Sanson, who had also been present at the execution.

Henri Sanson was appointed Executioner of Paris from April 1793, and would later execute Marie Antoinette.

Leboucher
Speaking to Victor Hugo in 1840, a man called Leboucher, who had arrived in Paris from Bourges in December 1792 and was present at the execution of Louis XVI, recalled vividly:

Louis-Sébastien Mercier
In Le nouveau Paris, Mercier describes the execution of Louis XVI in these words:

Jacques de Molay 
A popular but apocryphal legend holds that as soon as the guillotine fell, an anonymous Freemason leaped on the scaffolding, plunged his hand into the blood, splashed drips of it onto the crown, and shouted, "Jacques de Molay, tu es vengé!" (usually translated as, "Jacques de Molay, thou art avenged"). De Molay (died 1314), the last Grand Master of the Knights Templar, had reportedly cursed Louis' ancestor Philip the Fair, after the latter had sentenced him to burn at the stake based on false confessions. The story spread widely and the phrase remains in use today to indicate the triumph of reason and logic over "religious superstition".

Burial in the cemetery of the Madeleine 
The body of Louis XVI was immediately transported to the old Church of the Madeleine (demolished in 1799), since the legislation in force forbade burial of his remains beside those of his father, the Dauphin Louis de France, at Sens. Two curates who had sworn fealty to the Revolution held a short memorial service at the church. One of them, Damoureau, stated in evidence:

On 21 January 1815 Louis XVI and his wife's remains were re-buried in the Basilica of Saint-Denis where in 1816 his brother, King Louis XVIII, had a funerary monument erected by Edme Gaulle.

Today 
The area where Louis XVI and later (16 October 1793) Marie Antoinette were buried, in the churchyard of St. Mary Magdaleine's, is today the "Square Louis XVI" greenspace, containing the classically self-effacing Expiatory Chapel completed in 1826 during the reign of Louis' youngest brother Charles X. The crypt altar stands above the exact spot where the remains of the Royal couple were originally laid to rest. The chapel narrowly escaped destruction on politico-ideological grounds during the violently anti-clerical period at the beginning of the 20th century.

Bibliography 
 Necker, Anne Louise Germaine, Considerations on the principal events of the French Revolution (1818)
 Hugo, Victor, The Memoirs of Victor Hugo (1899)
 Thompson, J.M., English Witnesses of the French Revolution (1938)

Paul and Pierrette Girault de Coursac have written a number of works on Louis XVI, including:
 Louis XVI, Roi Martyr (1982) Tequi
 Louis XVI, un Visage retrouvé (1990) O.E.I.L.

Notes

External link 

1793 events of the French Revolution
Louis XVI
Louis XVI
Louis XVI
18th century in Paris
Public executions